Maya Lynne Robinson is an American actress, writer and producer. She is best known for her portrayal of Geena, D.J. Conner's wife, in the Roseanne television spin-off The Conners and the role of Michelle on the CBS series The Unicorn.

Life and career 
Robinson was born and raised in Cleveland, Ohio. In 2012, she moved from New York City to Los Angeles, where she co-starred in the  play In the Red and Brown Water.

In 2018, Robinson was cast in the series regular role of Geena on the Roseanne spinoff series The Conners. Geena is D.J. Conner's wife, the mother of their child Mary and a 2nd lieutenant in the Army recently returned from a tour in Afghanistan. She portrayed Geena for one season. 

In 2019, she joined the starring cast of the sitcom The Unicorn, where she portrayed  Michelle.

As of 2021, Robinson has a recurring role on the NBC comedy series Grand Crew.

Filmography

Film

Television

Theatre roles

Awards and nominations

References

External links 
 Official website
 

Actresses from Cleveland
African-American actresses
Living people
Year of birth missing (living people)
21st-century African-American people
21st-century African-American women